Elmwood, also known as the William N. Alward House, is a historic home located at Nunda in Livingston County, New York. It was built about 1855 and is a two-story, Italianate style frame dwelling designed by Rochester architects Austin & Warner.  It has an overhanging low hipped roof with decorative brackets and topped by a cupola.  It features a double wood door entrance with a surround of decorative side panels, ornate brackets and a projecting, decorative wood balconette.  Also on the property are contributing two gambrel roofed barns (c. 1885, c. 1890), a fieldstone gas house (c. 1891), a small glass and wood greenhouse, and a small shed and a larger shed/workshop.

It was listed on the National Register of Historic Places in 2015.

References

Houses on the National Register of Historic Places in New York (state)
Italianate architecture in New York (state)
Houses completed in 1855
Houses in Livingston County, New York
National Register of Historic Places in Livingston County, New York